Toil is a studio album by the Chicago Celtic punk band Flatfoot 56, released on August 14, 2012, by Paper + Plastick. The release is the fourth studio album released by the group since they were signed by a label. Johnny Rioux, a member of the Celtic punk band Street Dogs, returned as the producer.

The album was released to generally favorable reviews. Critics and fans enjoyed the album's diversity of sound and song writing. Reviewers described the album's songs as working-class anthems with Christian themes. The final track on the album, a Celtic punk cover of the hymn "I'll Fly Away", was well received by music critics. The album produced one single, "I Believe It", that was released as a music video. Both the album and the single failed to chart. The track "Winter in Chicago" was featured on the soundtrack for the video game Watch Dogs.

Background and recording
While on tour in 2011, Flatfoot 56 played at Summerfest in Milwaukee with Less than Jake. Less than Jake drummer Vinnie Fiorello, owner of Paper + Plastick, saw the band play and was impressed by their energy and performance. When he discovered that the band was looking for a record label, he offered to sign them.

Johnny Rioux, who had produced Flatfoot 56's last album, Black Thorn, was chosen as the album's producer. The band felt that having the same producer improved communication and allowed the band to work more freely. According to frontman Tobin Bawinkel, this familiarity allowed Rioux to encourage the band to advance musically and think differently. During January 2012, the band recorded the entire album at the Atlas Studios in Chicago, Illinois.

Writing and composition
The album's lyrics have been described as an anthematic examination of the struggles of the American working class and politically liberal. Along with highlighting the struggles of blue-collar America, the lyrics portray the idea that there is hope even when things appear to be bleak and that giving up is not an option. While there are Christian themes throughout the songs, neither Christian nor secular reviewers found them to be preachy.

"Brother, Brother", the first song on the album, is inspired by the band members' experience with the drug use of friends. Bawinkel stated in an interview that "a bunch of the tunes cover what we wanted to say to them during those times [when friends returned to using drugs]." Michael Weaver, writing for Jesus Freak Hideout, interpreted the song as an attempt to convince this individual to turn his or her life around and return to the Christian faith. The next track, named "The Rich, The Strong and The Poor", tells the story of three men looking for happiness. The first tries to find it in money, but he returns unfulfilled. The second tries looking for happiness in physical strength. He believes that if he proves himself, that he will find peace. Like the first man, he ends up unfulfilled. The final man looks for happiness in basic life needs and likewise ends up in the same position as the first two men. Bawinkel explains that, "all three are very much in the same position in that happiness hasn’t been found in chasing these various desires. There is something more which is hopeful for some and frustrating for others."

The third song on the album, "I Believe It", was the subject of the band's only music video from Toil. The video shows the band singing the song acoustically in the studio, much like the version that is featured on the album. Instrumentally, the song is guitar-driven and features the mandolin. The lyrics remind the listener to continue going forward even if it is painful. The song has been seen as symbol of the band's faith. The title track, "Toil", is an acoustic protest song that was compared by one reviewer to the Bruce Springsteen album Wrecking Ball. The lyrics tell the story of an unhappy, overworked, working-class man. The song ends with the lyrics, "I'm a slave to that whistle call. I’m a slave." The tenth song, "6'10"", is an alt-country ballad that was written in response to people making jokes about Bawinkle's height.

Reception

Toil was received positively by reviewers, though the album and its single failed to chart. Absolute Punk's reviewer commented that the album was "fun" and a "rabble-rouser." Jesus Freak Hideout's reviewer thought Toil was Flatfoot 56's best work to date and that the album showed the band improving with age. Innocent Words' reviewer agreed with Jesus Freak Hideout's assessment, while David Von Bader, from Consequence of Sound, felt that the album was a step towards broader appeal.

The final song on the album was well received by reviewers. The song, a Celtic punk cover of "I'll Fly Away", is the band's take on a widely recorded traditional hymn. AMPs reviewer called the cover "perfectly-executed". Danny Exyle, writing for Punk News, called the song a "crowd favorite" for fans of the band's live show. Jesus Freak Hideout's reviewer viewed the release of another hymn on one of Flatfoot 56's albums very favorably; the band had covered "Amazing Grace" on an earlier album. He concluded stating "anyone who thought hymns were boring [has] not heard a Flatfoot 56 rendition."

Track listing
 Brother, Brother - 2:32
 The Rich, The Strong and The Poor - 3:09
 I Believe It - 2:44
 Take Hold Again - 3:28
 Toil - 3:37
 Live or Die Trying - 3:24
 Work For Them - 2:15
 Terrorizing Truth - 2:45
 Strongman - 2:56
 6'10 - 2:32
 This Time - 3:15
 Winter In Chicago - 3:10
 I'll Fly Away - 2:44

Personnel
Personnel as listed on Allmusic:

Flatfoot 56
Tobin Bawinkel — guitar, vocals
Justin Bawinkel — drums, vocals
Kyle Bawinkel — bass, vocals
Brandon Good — guitar, harmonica, mandolin, vocals
Eric McMahon — bagpipes, guitar, vocals

Production and recording
Johnny Rioux —  producer
Tim Rusin — mixing
Justin Yates — engineer
Stephen Egerton —  mastering
Albert E. Brumley —  composer

Artwork and photography
Ryan Besch — artwork
Anthony Barlich — photography
Chad Sengstock — photography

Guest musicians
Jane Bawinkel — vocals
Cuddy — vocals
David Daniher — bagpipes
Rebecca Faber — violin
Maron Gaffron — vocals
Dan Hanson — banjo
Joby —  cello
Josh Robieson (ex-Flatfoot 56) —  bagpipes
Kevin Phlanz — vocals
Robert Powell —  tambourine, vocals
Jon Pratt — vocals
Johnny Rioux (Street Dogs) —  vocals
Ginger Rob — vocals
Spider — upright bass
Turbovamps — vocals
Jimmy Wasion — piano
Kyle Wilnewie — vocals

Notes

References and bibliography

External links

2012 albums
Flatfoot 56 albums